Wickford Harbor Light, now officially Wickford Harbor Light 1, was built in 1882 as a square wood tower attached to a -story keeper's dwelling on Old Gay Rock on the south side of the entrance to Wickford Harbor on the west side of Narragansett Bay. It was deactivated and torn down in 1930 and replaced with the current black steel skeleton tower.

References

Lighthouses in Washington County, Rhode Island
Narragansett Bay
North Kingstown, Rhode Island
Lighthouses completed in 1882
Houses completed in 1882
Buildings and structures demolished in 1930
1882 establishments in Rhode Island
Demolished buildings and structures in Rhode Island